A broom wagon (also known as a SAG wagon) is a vehicle that follows a cycling road race "sweeping" up stragglers who are unable to make it to the finish within the time permitted. If a cyclist chooses to continue behind the broom wagon, they cease to be part of the convoy (and the race), and must then follow the usual traffic rules and laws. Though the nominal function of the broom wagon is to collect riders who cannot continue to race, its operators will often provide words of comfort and support to a dropped rider, encouraging them to persevere.

History
In the Tour de France, the vehicle used was traditionally a Citroën H Van. The expression "broom wagon" is a translation of the French, voiture balai, and it was seen first at the 1910 Tour. The broom wagon of the Tour de France did indeed once carry a broom fixed above the driver's cab—except in the years that it was sponsored by a vacuum-cleaner company. Likewise, in other road cycling races, it is not rare to see real brooms affixed to the broom wagon.

The use of broom wagons has expanded to other sports events—especially in marathon events, a broom wagon is a common feature. In marathons, many amateur runners join in and sometimes are not able to reach the finish line within the allocated time. The broom wagon puts an end to their race, and the runners have to hand in their numbers. Also, off-road races like the Dakar Rally have come to use a broom wagon that follows on the track, picking up motorists who have broken down.

Broom bike 
In trail races, there is usually a "broom bike". Bigger races use a motorcycle, but smaller events will use a race marshal on a bicycle. He "sweeps" the course to ensure that it is clear. While unable to pick up incapacitated competitors, the broom bike may offer limited mechanical assistance and phone for assistance.

References 

Road bicycle racing terminology
Vans